Chrysaora chinensis, or the Indonesian sea nettle, is a species of jellyfish in the family Pelagiidae. It is native to the central Indo-Pacific region and its sting is considered dangerous.

First described by Ernst Vanhöffen in 1888, in 1910 it was considered a variant of C. helvola and in 1954 it was considered a synonym if it, while other authorities have considered it as a synonym of various other Chrysaora species. Although the type specimen of C. chinensis apparently no longer exists, the species of the central Indo-Pacific region is different both from relatives in the northeast Pacific (the region where C. helvola was described) and those found elsewhere. As a consequence, recent authorities recognize it as a valid species.

References

Chrysaora
Taxa named by Ernst Vanhöffen
Animals described in 1888